The CAMS 90 was an amphibious observation flying boat built in the early 1930s. The wings were made of wood, but the hull was of all-metal construction. The Lorraine Mizar engine was mounted in a pusher configuration.

Specifications

References

Flying boats
Amphibious aircraft
CAMS aircraft
1930s French bomber aircraft
Aircraft first flown in 1932